Vegas is an American period drama television series that ran on CBS from September 25, 2012 to May 10, 2013. The series starred Dennis Quaid and Michael Chiklis. The series was co-created by Las Vegas chronicler and Casino screenwriter Nicholas Pileggi, who also wrote the pilot.

Vegas received a 22-episode full season on October 23, 2012. CBS later reduced the order to 21 episodes. On March 7, 2013, CBS announced that Vegas would move to Friday nights at 9:00 p.m. ET, beginning April 5, 2013. On May 10, 2013, CBS canceled the series after one season.

Synopsis
Set in 1960s Las Vegas, the series centers on Sheriff Ralph Lamb (Quaid) and his dealings with Chicago mobster Vincent Savino (Chiklis), who moved west to set up his own operation.  The Lamb character is based on a real-life former rancher of the same name who served as Sheriff of Clark County from 1961 to 1979.

Cast and characters

Main
 Dennis Quaid as Sheriff Ralph Lamb, a local rancher with service in the military police during World War II. Lamb is pressed into duty as Sheriff of Clark County when the Mob begins aggressively taking hold of the Las Vegas gambling industry.
 Michael Chiklis as Vincent Savino, manager of the Savoy Hotel, which is run by the Chicago Outfit. An expert in gambling, Savino previously ran casinos for the Mob in Havana before being sent to run the Savoy. While being a high-ranking mob associate and close to Chicago mob capo Angelo LaFratta, he is not a made man due to being a quarter Irish on his father's side (while in other episodes he is said to be a full member of the Outfit).
 Carrie-Anne Moss as Katherine O'Connell, the Las Vegas Assistant District Attorney.
 Jason O'Mara as Deputy Jack Lamb, Ralph's younger brother who serves as his deputy.
 Taylor Handley as Dixon Lamb, Ralph's son.  His youthful exuberance makes it difficult for Ralph to trust his judgment at times.
 Sarah Jones as Mia Rizzo, the Savoy count room manager responsible for skimming funds for the Mob.

Recurring
 Aimee Garcia as Yvonne Sanchez, the receptionist working at the sheriff's station and Dixon's later lover.
 Vinessa Shaw as Laura Savino, Savino's wife.
 Michael O'Neill as Las Vegas mayor Ted Bennett, who is standing for re-election. He is later defeated by an associate of Savino's.
 Shawn Doyle as Patrick Byrne, an FBI agent investigating Savino.
 Melinda Clarke as Lena Cavallo, Mia's mother.
 Enver Gjokaj as Tommy Stone, entertainment director at The Savoy.  Mia and he have an affair after her falling out with Jack.
 Michael Ironside as Porter Gainsley, a mining tycoon responsible for Ralph's wife's death and Savino's forced partner in acquiring The Tumbleweed for Chicago.

The Mafia
 James Russo as Anthony "Red" Cervelli, Savino's right-hand man, who briefly ran The Savoy before being replaced by the more experienced Savino. While an experienced enforcer and hitman, he is often shown to be bumbling and inept, and somewhat friendlier than his associates.
 Michael Reilly Burke as Rich Reynolds, the corrupt district attorney.
 Michael Wiseman as Johnny Rizzo, Mia's father. Rizzo has a dangerous temper but is a major moneymaker for Chicago.  He later becomes Chicago's boss of Las Vegas after killing Capo Angelo LaFratta.
 Jonathan Banks as Angelo LaFratta, one of the bosses from Chicago and leader of the Chicago Outfit's Las Vegas operations (though in one episode stated to be the head of the Outfit in its entirety). He is a close friend of Savino's, but this does not save the latter from nearly being executed for nearly starting a war with Milwaukee. He is killed and replaced by Johnny Rizzo on orders of the bosses, who did not approve of him returning The Tumbleweed casino to Milwaukee.
 Sonny Marinelli as Nicholas Cota, a mobster, and hitman for the Chicago Outfit who was working for Red when he ran the Savoy and continues to serve under Savino, whom he had met before the latter went running Chicago's Cuba operations.
 Joe Sabatino as Vic Borelli, another mobster from Chicago sent to Vegas to run The Savoy. Savino and he were good friends back home, and Savino is saddened when Milwaukee hitman Jones kills him out of payback for the death of Davey Cornaro.
 Jamie McShane as Davey Cornaro, leader of the Milwaukee crime family's operations in Vegas and Savino's first rival in his plight for control of The Tumbleweed. Cornaro controls a workers' union at the casino and orders an unsanctioned hit on Savino when told to drop it. He is later killed by Red Cervelli and Vic Borelli, who buries his body on a farm, where it is later found.
 Damon Herriman as Mr. Jones, a shady hitman from Milwaukee whose true name is a mystery. He is sent to investigate the disappearance of Davey Cornaro and returns to murder Savino when the body is found on a farm. After being captured by law enforcement, Jones escapes and is spared by Savino, who orders him to work for him alone. The hitman is key in helping the forces of Lamb and Savino take down Porter Gainsley.

Creation and production
The idea for Vegas first came to Pileggi while he was researching the book Casino, and as a result of his research into the Las Vegas of the 70s and 80s, he decided to also write about the city in the era of the 60s. However, it was 25 years before the idea came to fruition as a TV series. Pileggi had initially planned to write the idea as a movie but found it difficult to make it work in the traditional three-act cinema form. Watching The Wire convinced him that the long-form TV series was a more suitable creative outlet for the story.

Episodes

International broadcasts

DVD release
The series was released on DVD as a five-disc set. All 21 episodes are included, as well as bonus features.

References

External links

2012 American television series debuts
2013 American television series endings
American action television series
2010s American crime drama television series
2010s American mystery television series
CBS original programming
English-language television shows
Television series about organized crime
Television series by CBS Studios
Television series set in the 1960s
Television shows set in Las Vegas
Fiction set in 1960
Fictional portrayals of the Las Vegas Metropolitan Police Department
Works about the Chicago Outfit